The 1972 Federation Cup was the tenth edition of the most important competition between national teams in women's tennis. 31 nations participated in the tournament, which was held at Ellis Park in Johannesburg, South Africa from 20–25 March. South Africa defeated Great Britain in the final, in what was the first final not featuring United States or Australia, giving South Africa their first title. South Africa became the first team other than United States or Australia to win the Fed Cup.

Participating teams

Draw
All ties were played at Ellis Park in Johannesburg, South Africa on hard courts.

First round
Israel vs. Canada

Norway vs. Chinese Taipei

Spain vs. Italy

West Germany vs. Greece

Ireland vs. Denmark

Finland vs. Argentina

Japan vs. Great Britain

France vs. Austria

Iran vs. Ecuador

Brazil vs. Switzerland

Belgium vs. South Africa

Netherlands vs. New Zealand

Colombia vs. Luxembourg

Uruguay vs. Mexico

Rhodesia vs. United States

Second round
Australia vs. Canada

Norway vs. Italy

West Germany vs. Ireland

Argentina vs. Great Britain

France vs. Ecuador

Brazil vs. South Africa

Netherlands vs. Colombia

Uruguay vs. United States

Quarterfinals
Australia vs. Italy

West Germany vs. Great Britain

France vs. South Africa

Netherlands vs. United States

Semifinals
Australia vs. Great Britain

South Africa vs. United States

Final
Great Britain vs. South Africa

Consolation Round
Teams which lost in the first or second round of the main draw went on to play in the Consolation Round.

Draw

First round
Mexico vs. Greece

Spain vs. Canada

Brazil vs. Luxembourg

Austria vs. Uruguay

Japan vs. Iran

Rhodesia vs. Norway

Denmark vs. Chinese Taipei

Second round
New Zealand vs. Finland

Switzerland vs. Colombia

Mexico vs. Canada

Brazil vs. Uruguay

Japan vs. Rhodesia

Belgium vs. Israel

Ecuador vs. Ireland

Quarterfinals
New Zealand vs. Colombia

Mexico vs. Uruguay

Japan vs. Denmark

Belgium vs. Ecuador

Semifinals
Colombia vs. Mexico

Japan vs. Belgium

Final
Colombia vs. Japan

See also
 1972 Wightman Cup

References

Billie Jean King Cups by year
Federation Cup
Federation Cup
Federation Cup
Federation Cup
Federation Cup
Federation Cup
Federation Cup
Federation Cup